is an athletic stadium in Nagasaki, Nagasaki, Japan.

It was one of the home stadiums of football club V-Varen Nagasaki.

References

External links
Official site

V-Varen Nagasaki
Athletics (track and field) venues in Japan
Buildings and structures in Nagasaki
Sports venues in Nagasaki Prefecture
Football venues in Japan